Thomas Roscoe (Liverpool 23 June 1791 – 24 September 1871 London) was an English author and translator.

Life

The fifth son of William Roscoe, he was born in Toxteth Park, Liverpool in 1791, and educated by Dr. W. Shepherd and by Mr. Lloyd, a private tutor.

Soon after his father's financial troubles in 1816, which led to bankruptcy, Roscoe began to write in local magazines and journals, and he continued to follow literature as a profession. He died at age 80, on 24 September 1871, at Acacia Road, St. John's Wood, London.

Works
Roscoe's major original works were:

Gonzalo, the Traitor: a Tragedy, 1820.
The King of the Peak [anon.], 1823, 3 vols.
Owain Goch: a Tale of the Revolution [anon.], 1827, 3 vols.
The Tourist in Switzerland and Italy, 1830; the first volume of the Landscape Annual, followed for eight years by similar volumes on Italy, France, and Spain.
Wanderings and Excursions in North Wales, 1836.
Wanderings in South Wales, with Louisa Anne Twamley the naturalist, 1837.
The London and Birmingham Railway, 1839. with illustrations from George Dodgson, William Radclyffe, Edward Radclyffe and others
Book of the Grand Junction Railway, 1839 (the last two were issued together as the Illustrated History of the London and North-Western Railway).
Miguel De Cervantes Saavedra, 1839 London Thomas Tegg
Legends of Venice, 1841.
Belgium in a Picturesque Tour, 1841.
A Summer Tour in the Isle of Wight, 1843.
Life of William the Conqueror, 1846.
The Last of the Abencerages, and other Poems, 1850.
The Fall of Granada.

Roscoe's translations were:

The Memoirs of Benvenuto Cellini, 1822.
Jean Charles Léonard de Sismondi, Literature of the South of Europe, 1823, 4 vols. Roscoe's annotations helped make the work popular.
Italian Novelists, 1825, 4 vols.
German Novelists, 1826, 4 vols.
Spanish Novelists, 1832, 3 vols.
Louis Joseph Antoine de Potter, Memoirs of Scipio de Ricci, 1828, 2 vols.
Luigi Lanzi, History of Painting in Italy, 1828, 6 vols.
Silvio Pellico, Imprisonments, 1833.
Pellico, Duties of Men, 1834.
Martín Fernández de Navarrete, Life of Cervantes, 1839 (in Murray's Family Library).
Johann Georg Kohl, Travels in England, 1845.

Roscoe edited The Juvenile Keepsake, 1828–30; The Novelists' Library, with Biographical and Critical Notices, 1831–3, 17 vols.; the works of Henry Fielding, Tobias Smollett, and Jonathan Swift (1840–9, 3 vols.), and new issues of his father's Lorenzo de' Medici and Leo the Tenth.

Family
Roscoe married, or cohabited with, Elizabeth Edwards, and had seven children, including Jane Elizabeth St John, writer and wife of Horace Stebbing Roscoe St John.

Notes

Attribution

External links
 
 
  Works of Thomas Roscoe at Google Books

1791 births
1871 deaths
English translators
English male dramatists and playwrights
19th-century English dramatists and playwrights
19th-century British translators
19th-century English male writers
English male non-fiction writers
Writers from Liverpool
People from Toxteth